Allen Tire Company a tire and wheel retailer in Southern California, USA, established in 1973, with 18 locations throughout the area. Modern Tire Dealer publishes lists of the top 100 independent tire store chains; Allen first appeared at around 50th place during the first decade of the twenty-first century. In December of 2020, it was acquired by Monro Inc.

Locations 

, the company had locations in Anaheim, Costa Mesa, Downey, Fullerton, Fountain Valley, Hemet, Huntington Beach, Lake Forest, Lakewood, Mission Viejo, Palm Springs, two in Riverside, two in Santa Ana, Torrance, Westminster and Yorba Linda.

References

External links 
 allentire.com

Automotive part retailers of the United States
Companies based in Los Angeles County, California
American companies established in 1973
Retail companies established in 1973
Lakewood, California
1973 establishments in California